Kazmaaul (Sala-Yurt; , Qandavur avul) is a rural locality (a selo) in Khasavyurtovsky District, Republic of Dagestan, Russia. The population was 1,662 as of 2010. There are 41 streets.

Geography 
Kandauraul is located 12 km north of Khasavyurt (the district's administrative centre) by road. Bammatyurt is the nearest rural locality.

References 

Rural localities in Khasavyurtovsky District